Saif-ur-Rehman (born 4 October 1996) is a Pakistani cricketer who plays for Lahore. He made his first-class debut on 2 November 2015 in the 2015–16 Quaid-e-Azam Trophy.

References

External links
 

1996 births
Living people
Pakistani cricketers
Lahore cricketers
Cricketers from Lahore